Razor Freestyle Scooter, known as Freestyle Scooter in Europe, is an extreme sports game released for the PlayStation, Game Boy Color, Dreamcast, Game Boy Advance and Nintendo 64.

Gameplay

Licensed by RazorUSA, a company that makes scooters and safety equipment, Razor Freestyle Scooter has player controlling one of ten characters though a series of three environments while trying to perform various stunts and aerial maneuvers (a total of 45 moves are available in the game).  The game was unlicensed outside of North America and released in Europe as Freestyle Scooter.

Built using the Grind Session skateboarding engine, Razor tells the story of a group of kids whose friends have been captured by an evil giant robot. Over the course of the game, the youngsters will have to complete an assortment of challenges to rescue their pals. Once the necessary tricks and objectives have been completed, a special level opens up where players will have an opportunity to rescue one of the captured friends.

After accomplishing this, players return to the main levels, this time with a more difficult set of challenges to overcome. The game does not end until all the special levels are unlocked, and all of the friends, including Ultimate Fighting Championship star Tito Ortiz, have been rescued.

The soundtrack features pop-punk artists such as Ex Number Five, Never Too Late and Sick Shift.

Reception

The PlayStation and Dreamcast versions received "mixed or average reviews" according to the review aggregation website Metacritic. David Chen of NextGen said that the former was "Far too easy, but it leaves you wondering why the big guys can't come up with new stuff too." Marc Saltzman of Gannett News rated the PlayStation version as 3.5/5 describing it as a "fun but easy diversion that's geared more towards the younger or casual gamer".

Reviewing the NTSC Dreamcast release Martin Mathers of Dreamcast Magazine likened the title to the Tony Hawk's series of games, giving it a score of 62% and arguing that "for all the incredibly well borrowed ideas it has, the developers appear to have forgotten to do anything extra on top of them to make the game worth owning".

References

External links

2000 video games
Advergames
Crave Entertainment games
Dreamcast games
Extreme sports video games
Game Boy Advance games
Game Boy Color games
Multiplayer and single-player video games
Nintendo 64 games
PlayStation (console) games
Ubisoft games
Video games developed in the United States
Crawfish Interactive games